The Mortal Engines Quartet (Hungry City Chronicles in the United States), also known as the Predator Cities Quartet, is a series of epic young adult fantasy novels by the British novelist and illustrator Philip Reeve. He began the first volume of the series, Mortal Engines, in the 1980s, and it was published in 2001. Reeve then published three further novels, Predator's Gold (2003), Infernal Devices (2005), and A Darkling Plain (2006). The series is set thousands of years after the Sixty Minute War has devastated Earth. It tells the story of young adventurers in the Traction Era, when moving cities roam for resources, achieved by attacking and devouring each other. The novels have won a number of awards, including the Nestlé Smarties Book Prize in 2002 for Mortal Engines and the 2006 Guardian Children's Fiction Prize and the 2007 Los Angeles Times Book Prize for Young Adult Fiction for A Darkling Plain.

A companion piece entitled The Traction Codex was released in 2011, and was expanded into The Illustrated World of Mortal Engines by Reeve and Jeremy Levett, which was published in 2018. Additionally, a collection of short stories set before the series called Night Flights was published the same year. Also, a prequel series, Fever Crumb, set 600 years before the events of the Quartet, was published between 2009 and 2011. In March 2020 Reeve said "too much time has passed since I wrote the other books, it's hard to go back to that world" and that he did not intend to publish further books related to the Mortal Engines universe.

On 18 November 2020, upon asked whether Mortal Engines would be rebooted for the television screens, Reeve responded that "it would be nice, but it seems unlikely."

Setting
The series is set thousands of years in the future in a time known as the Traction Era, in which Earth has been reduced to a wasteland by a devastating conflict known as the Sixty Minute War. Nations no longer exist except in the lands of the Anti-Traction League, whereas Traction Cities—mobile cities often mounted on caterpillar tracks—are fiercely independent city-states that use giant mechanical jaws to dismantle one another for resources. Trade is mostly accomplished by airship or between mobile cities of roughly equal size (which are thus unable to devour each other). Old-Tech (technology from before the Traction Era, some from the 21st century) is the most sought after commodity.

 The Great Hunting Ground – Consists of Europe and Northern Asia, and is the domain of the Traction Cities. It is a muddy wasteland in which the constant movement of the cities has destroyed all vegetation. The land is identified by city-dwellers as the "Out-Country".
 The Ice Wastes – New name for the Arctic, wherein Traction Cities use iron runners to skate across the ice. In some places, the ice is thin, and they risk falling into the ocean.
 Africa – Africa is split between the Sahara Desert, governed by Traction Cities, and the southern regions, run by Anti-Tractionists. Southern areas of the continent include the static cities of Zagwa and Tibetsi, and the highland area known as the Mountains of the Moon.
 The Dead Continent – North America, supposedly reduced to an irradiated wasteland by the Sixty Minute War. In Predator's Gold, it is proven not to be completely dead; in the north there are forests with some animals that survived the Sixty Minute War.
 Asia – The stronghold of the Anti-Traction League. Eastern China is evidently eradicated by the War and the Himalayas serve as the center for Anti-Tractionist civilization, where the mountains make it impossible for mobile cities to approach.
 Nuevo Maya – New name for South America, severed from North America when "slow bombs" destroyed Central America during the war. Static settlements rule the Andes, but the lowlands are filled with ziggurat Traction Cities. Protagonists Tom and Hester visit Nuevo Maya between the first two books, but it is never visited in the text of the books.
 Antarctica – Mentioned only once and evidently the domain of oil drilling Traction Cities. Tom and Hester visit Antarctica between the first two books, but it is not described in the text of the books.
 Anchorage-in-Vineland – The static and stable version of the Traction City of Anchorage which had decided to stop wandering the Arctic wastes and settle in the green and unspoiled land of Vineland (in North America). When Anchorage was a Traction City, it was not predatory but chose to gain its wealth by trading with other cities.

Title
The title is a quotation from Act III, Scene III of William Shakespeare's play Othello ("Othello: And O you mortal engines whose rude throats/Th'immortal Jove's dread clamors counterfeit..." – Line 356/357). It refers to the fact that the society of Municipal Darwinism is not sustainable living and that the cities' engines are indeed mortal.

Plot

Mortal Engines

The book starts with the traction city of London chasing and catching a small mining town called Salthook. After he skips a chore, Tom Natsworthy, a teenage Apprentice Historian, is sent to the "Gut" of London where towns are stripped for resources. Tom incidentally meets the Head of the Guild of Historians, Thaddeus Valentine, along with his daughter, Katherine. One of Salthook's residents, teenager Hester Shaw, attempts to assassinate Valentine, but Tom interferes and chases her. She reveals a disfiguring scar on her face and claims Valentine caused it, then escaping the London police through a chute. When Tom informs Valentine of her name, Valentine pushes him into the chute. Tom and Hester recover outside of London within the Hunting Ground and after an argument start following the city's tracks to reboard it.

The pair eventually board a small town called Speedwell, where the owner Orme Wreyland drugs them, planning to sell the pair as slaves for profit at a trading cluster. Tom and Hester escape from Wreyland, meeting a friendly airship pilot called Anna Fang. Fang takes them in her airship, the Jenny Haniver, to the neutral flying city of Airhaven where they can find a passage to London. At Airhaven they are attacked by a cyborg "Stalker" called Shrike, sent by London Mayor Magnus Crome, with instructions to kill the pair and bring their bodies to Crome.

Tom and Hester escape by stealing a hot air balloon and drift over the Hunting Ground. Hester reveals that when she was a child, her parents were killed by Valentine when they would not give up an ancient machine. Valentine then injured Hester, believing her to be dead. Hester escaped and Shrike took care of her for most of her childhood. Despite the fact that Shrike was not supposed to have feelings, he developed a father-like bond with Hester. Desperate to avenge her parents, Hester traveled to London despite Shrike's pleas for her to stay. Shrike followed, reaching London first, but was captured by Crome and used to create more Stalkers for London.

As the pair travel over the Hunting Ground, Hester sees that a London-built scoutship is following them and lowers the balloon. Shrike is on board and attempts to confront them, but before he can explain why he wants Hester to die, two chasing towns run him over, and Tom and Hester manage to board the pirate town Tunbridge Wheels. The mayor, Chrysler Peavy, who knows Hester from her days with Shrike, frees Tom because he is a resident of London and Peavy wishes to learn etiquette worthy of a Londoner gentleman. Tom convinces him to free Hester. Peavy informs them that he plans to consume the downed Airhaven. While charging at it over shallow water, Tunbridge Wheels beaches on a coral reef, sinking it whilst the survivors escape inland with Tom and Hester. Whilst attempting to feebly retake Airhaven, Peavy gets stuck in a bog and his pirate subordinates shoot him, then attempt to execute Tom and Hester. Shrike intervenes and kills the remaining pirates. He explains that Crome had agreed to resurrect Hester as a Stalker when he brings her body back to Crome. She agrees to this, but Tom intervenes by stabbing Shrike in the eye, shutting him down and saving her life.

Valentine is sent away by Crome on a "secret mission", much to Katherine's dismay. Suspicious of her father, Katherine begins investigating events in London with the help of Apprentice Engineer Bevis Pod, whom she befriends after discovering he witnessed Tom chasing Hester. They discover that Valentine salvaged a monstrous ancient weapon called MEDUSA for London and that the Guild of Engineers have reassembled it inside St Paul's Cathedral. The Cathedral's dome splits open to reveal MEDUSA, which is then used to destroy a much larger city pursuing London. 

Tom and Hester are rescued by Fang, who is revealed to be an Anti-Traction League agent and takes them to the Shield Wall of Batmunkh Gompa which protects the nation-state of the League. Fang suspects that the weapon that London has reassembled will be used to destroy the Shield Wall and warns League Governor Khan of MEDUSA. Khan is skeptical that London will attack but Fang insists that they should bomb London to destroy the weapon. Convinced that the League will kill innocent people and destroy his home, Tom storms out and discovers that Valentine has infiltrated Batmunkh Gompa as a monk. Tom raises the alarm but Valentine successfully cripples the League's northern fleet of airships. Valentine duels and kills Fang by stabbing her in the neck before escaping in his own airship the 13th Floor Elevator. Tom and Hester take the Jenny Haniver and fly it back to London in hopes of stopping Valentine and MEDUSA themselves.

Crome guides London east toward the Anti-Traction League's base behind the Shield Wall of Batmunkh Gompa, all in the hope of using MEDUSA to destroy their defenses and devour their settlements. After Valentine returns, Katherine learns that MEDUSA was originally found by Hester's mother, Pandora, and that he had killed her in order to steal it for London. He also admits that Katherine is likely Hester's half-sister. Disillusioned and horrified by the destructive power of the weapon, Katherine and Bevis conspire to plant a bomb to destroy MEDUSA. They are caught in the attempt and Bevis is shot by the Engineers.

The Guild of Historians, led by Tom's boss Chudleigh Pomeroy, come to their aid, and battle with the Engineers. Katherine travels up to the Top Tier, to Saint Paul's Cathedral, with Bevis disguised as her captor. Tom and Hester arrive and Hester attempts to fight her way to Valentine and avenge her parents. Tom is attacked by the 13th Floor Elevator above London and shoots it down. Bevis is killed when the airship crushes him, but Katherine is able to reach Saint Paul's Cathedral. Inside, she sees Hester brought before Valentine. When he attempts to kill her, Katherine jumps in the way and is fatally wounded. She falls onto a keyboard, interrupting the firing sequence of MEDUSA, causing it to malfunction. Valentine and Hester briefly put aside their differences and try to get Katherine to Tom for help, but she dies before they can reach him.

Hester leaves with Tom in the airship while Valentine chooses to stay behind in London. MEDUSA finally misfires, obliterating most of the city and killing Valentine. Hester tries to comfort a grief stricken Tom as they fly away in the Jenny Haniver, apparently the only survivors of the incident, and make their way to the Bird Roads.

Predator's Gold

Aboard Airhaven, Tom and Hester meet adventurer and author Nimrod Pennyroyal who persuades them to take him as a passenger. They are soon pursued by airships of the Green Storm, a fanatical splinter group of the Anti-Traction League. They seek the Jenny Haniver as they believe it was stolen from their deceased leader, Anna Fang. Despite evading the airships, the Jenny Haniver is damaged and drifts helplessly over the Ice Wastes. They are rescued by Anchorage, which was once a thriving Traction City that relied primarily upon trade, but had recently been devastated by an excavated biological weapon that killed most of the inhabitants. The survivors have set a course for North America, which is believed to be a radioactive wasteland since the Sixty Minute War. The city is ruled by the young margravine Freya Rasmussen, who treats all three of them as honoured guests and appoints Pennyroyal as the city's chief navigator because of his past experiences (detailed in his book America the Beautiful) traveling in America. As Anchorage's harbormaster works to repair the Jenny Haniver, Hester becomes jealous of Tom's growing closeness to Freya, and is also disturbed by the sightings of "ghosts" in the city. Eventually she sees Tom kissing Freya, and flies away from the city in the Jenny Haniver. Thereafter, Hester sells Anchorage's course to Piotr Masgard, the leader of the "Huntsmen" of the Traction City of Arkangel, who intends to capture the city through an airship invasion; rather than accepting money as payment for this information, she insists that when Arkangel eats Anchorage, Tom be returned to her. As she returns to the Jenny Haniver, however, she is drugged and kidnapped by a Green Storm informant. 

Hester is taken to Rogue's Roost, an island south of Greenland, where the Green Storm have converted Anna Fang's body into a Stalker. The commander, Sathya, hopes to restore Fang's memories by showing her Hester, but the resurrected Fang doesn't recognise her nor herself. Sathya reveals that, according to her intelligence, Hester's father was Thaddeus Valentine.

Tom realizes that Pennyroyal never went to America, and based his entire book on an old explorer's map in the Reykjavík library. On his way to reveal Pennyroyal's deception to the chief engineer, Tom finds out that the "ghosts" sighted around Anchorage are thieves, operating out of a parasitic submarine-like limpet attached to the bottom of the city, who call themselves the Lost Boys and work out of a larger group in the sunken city of Grimsby. With their secret discovered, they kidnap Tom and leave the city. Tom develops a sort of friendship with a reluctant Lost Boy, Caul, on their trip to Grimsby. Caul tells him that the city is ruled by "Uncle", a man who founded it as a base of thieves and keeps the Lost Boys under constant surveillance.

When they arrive in Grimsby, Tom is taken to see Uncle, who tells him there is something valuable in Rogues' Roost which he wants Tom to steal for him. In return, Tom will have the chance to rescue Hester. Tom climbs a ladder up the rocky cliffs to infiltrate the base, but he is soon discovered and reunited with Hester in her cell. Realising that Uncle sent Tom to die as a diversion, Caul prematurely detonates the charges the Lost Boys were positioning inside the Roost, sabotaging the operation, but saving Tom and Hester. In the confusion, most of the Lost Boys make their way to the chamber where the Stalker Fang is kept, but the Stalker easily kills them all. She then pursues Tom and Hester into the island hangar where the Jenny Haniver is kept, but lets them escape when she seemingly recognises Tom, and then takes command of the Green Storm forces from Sathya.

In Grimsby, after Uncle severely beats Caul for his betrayal, then leaves him to die by hanging, and informs the younger man that he knew Anna Fang when he was younger. Fang was a slave in Arkangel, but Uncle began to love her and released her. She betrayed him by building an airship and escaping from slavery. After Uncle was disowned by his family, he built Grimsby to make sure that nobody kept a secret from him ever again. Uncle wanted to retrieve Fang from Rogue's Roost to reprogram her to become his slave. Caul is saved by fellow Lost Boy Gargle, who wanted to repay Caul's kindness to him. Gargle gives Caul the Reykjavik map that Uncle had all along, and sends him back to Anchorage on a limpet.

Freya catches Pennyroyal secretly broadcasting a radio message asking for someone to come and get him off of Anchorage, and he subsequently admits to her that his claims of traveling to America were all lies. Arkangel chases Anchorage, leading to the Huntsmen led by Masgard capturing Anchorage and leaving it helpless on the ice to be eaten. Tom and Hester return to the city, where Pennyroyal has evaded capture. Hester sends Tom to hide, and later liberates the inhabitants, killing Masgard and the Hunstmen in the process. Tom confronts Pennyroyal, who knows that Hester sold Anchorage to Masgard, but doesn't tell Tom. Attempting to scare Tom off, Pennyroyal accidentally shoots Tom in the chest. He then steals the Jenny Haniver and escapes. Arkangel still pursues Anchorage, but becomes trapped over thin ice, leading Anchorage to drift on the ocean on an ice floe.

With the revelation that Pennyroyal is a fraud, the inhabitants lose hope in the salvation of their city, until Caul arrives with the Reykjavik map, and convinces them to continue. Meanwhile, Pennyroyal escapes to the Hunting Ground, and soon publishes a book reimagining the events of Anchorage's flight west, with himself as the hero and exposing the Lost Boys. Arkangel is evacuated and eventually sinks to the bottom of the ocean. In Asia, the Green Storm, under the leadership of the Stalker Fang, topples the old Anti-Traction League. Anchorage eventually makes it to North America, and finds it verdant and lush. Tom recovers from his wound, but is still very weak. Hester takes comfort in the knowledge that the city will be secret and safe in this new land, and is pleased to discover that she is pregnant.

Infernal Devices

Sixteen years after the events of Predator's Gold, the former ice city of Anchorage has settled on an island in North America unaffected by the fallout from the Sixty Minute War and has become a static city named Anchorage-in-Vineland. Most of the inhabitants are happy with their new life, but Wren Natsworthy, the teenage daughter of Tom Natsworthy and Hester Shaw, is bored with her life and seeks adventure.

When she sneaks out one night Wren encounters three Lost Boys, Remora, Fishcake and their older leader Gargle; who have come to Anchorage in search of a mysterious Rasmussen family artifact named the Tin Book. The Book, bearing the insignia of the President of the United States of America, contains the activation codes for the final remaining orbital weapons left over from the Sixty Minute War; potentially with firepower far greater than that of MEDUSA, which destroyed the Traction City of London in Mortal Engines. After meeting former Lost Boy now Anchorage resident Caul, who refuses to help him, Gargle persuades Wren to retrieve the Tin Book for him and to join them on their journeys around the world.

Wren begins her mission by asking the now-adult margravine Freya Rasmussen, knowing that the Book is in the palace's library. Freya tells Wren of the Book's origins but explains that no one knows its purpose or meaning. When Wren reports to Gargle he tells her that Nimrod Pennyroyal's book about the time he spent in Anchorage has revealed the Lost Boys' existence to the raft cities that they previously robbed. As a result, the Lost Boys have been forced to loot cities further afield, but most of the Lost Boys' limpets never return. Gargle explains that raft cities have also begun searching for Grimsby and claims the Tin Book contains information that could get the sunken city moving again; but in actuality he intends to sell it to Stalker Fang for protection.

Unaware of Gargle's true intentions, Wren steals the Book and gives it to him, whilst Caul alerts to Tom and Hester that Wren is missing. Hester finds the limpet and, believing that Wren is in danger, shoots and kills Gargle and Remora. Fishcake, devastated by the death of his comrades, kidnaps Wren with the intention of taking her to Grimsby. En route to the sunken city, Fishcake receives a communication from the raft resort of Brighton, claiming that the parents of kidnapped Lost Boys have united to track down their missing children. Fishcake, believing that he will be reunited with his parents and persuaded by Wren who believes her best chance of escape is there, changes course to Brighton.

Arriving at the raft-city pleasure resort, the pair's limpet is captured and the two are taken in as slaves, the communication being a ruse to stop the Lost Boys. The owner of the slave trade company, Nabisco Skhin, intends to sell the two to Traction Cities in Nuevo Maya, but Wren convinces him to give them to Pennyroyal, who is now Mayor of Brighton; due to Wren's knowledge of Anchorage (and thus can expose Pennyroyal's lies). Skhin interrogates Fishcake, who reveals the location of Grimsby, prompting Brighton to change course and destroy it with depth charges. Skhin takes Wren up to Pennyroyal's floating palace above Brighton, Cloud 9. The slave-owner attempts to extort a hefty sum from Pennyroyal for Wren and to have the truth silenced, but Wren suddenly claims that she is a Lost Girl and has never been to Anchorage. She gives Pennyroyal the Tin Book and is employed in his household, to serve as a handmaiden for his overbearing wife Boo-Boo. Skhin, angered by Wren's lie, employs Fishcake to lead him to Anchorage and to enslave everyone there.

Tom and Hester take an old limpet with Caul and Freya to Grimsby to save Wren. When they arrive, they find the wreckage of the sunk city and the bodies of many Lost Boys. The four meet Uncle in his chamber, who informs them that Gargle's limpet hasn't returned and that Wren is likely in Brighton. Uncle seemingly wins Caul back to the Lost Boys, who locks Tom, Hester and Freya up; but Caul later frees them when Uncle is asleep. Uncle eventually discovers them, but is killed when he shoots the balloon holding his monitoring screens and they collapse on him. Tom and Hester take Caul's old limpet to find Wren, whilst Caul and Freya take the remaining Lost Boys back to Anchorage where the pair marry.

Meanwhile, the Stalker Shrike, who was seemingly killed by Tom in Mortal Engines is 're-resurrected' to mark the Stalker Fang's birthday by Dr. Oenone Zero; albeit with his previous memories wiped. Zero is promoted to Fang's Surgeon-Mechanic, though she intends to assassinate the Stalker as revenge for her aviator brother Eno being resurrected into a Stalker. Fang has the Green Storm armies extend their borders via bombing and destroying Traction Cities, starting a war with the Traktionstadtsgesellschaft. Zero is followed by Shrike to a Christian chapel, where she confides aloud that she will kill the Stalker Fang with a mysterious weapon. He prepares to kill her, but cannot bring himself to, nor alert the authorities of her treachery. Shrike realises that Zero has implemented a barrier that disables him from betraying her; but he intends to stop her from assassinating Fang. 

Wren makes friends with fellow slave Cynthia Twite and another young African slave, Theo Ngoni, who used to be a Green Storm kamikaze aviator that was captured. Wren plots to escape on Pennyroyal's private sky-yacht the Peewit by enlisting Theo's help, but he refuses. Skhin meets with Pennyroyal's advisor on Old-Tech, Walter Plovery, who explains what the Tin Book contains and orders him to retrieve it for him. The Moon Festival, a time when no city hunts nor eats each other, arrives as Brighton meets a few other cities on the shores of Africa. Plovery is invited to a dinner-party held by Pennyroyal and breaks into the Mayor's office, but is killed by an intruder. Wren and Theo are nearly arrested by Pennyroyal, as she tricked Cloud 9 aviators to refuel the Peewit, but Boo-Boo saves them, falsely believing that Wren and Theo are in love.

Tom and Hester arrive in Brighton, and split up to search for Wren. Hester discovers Pennyroyal's corrupted version of the events of Predator's Gold, including that she sold Anchorage to Arkangel and the renamed exhibited Jenny Haniver. Tom meets with Skhin to negotiate Wren's release but is captured. Skhin plans to use Tom and Wren to expose Pennyroyal is a fraud and retrieve the Tin Book to sell off to the highest bidder. Told by Tom via a note that he was going to the Pepperpot, Skhin's base of operations, Hester plans to release the slaves inside to create a panic.

At the Moon Festival, Skhin confronts Wren and asks her to fetch the Tin Book for him. Wren manages to get Theo's help and discovers a Green Storm Stalker-bird inside the safe. Destroying it and taking the Tin Book, the pair discover that Cloud 9 has been set adrift and that a Green Storm airship is heading toward Brighton. Hester breaks into the Pepperpot and releases the Lost Boy slaves. Fishcake visits Tom in his cell and tells him that Wren is on Cloud 9, and Tom promises to take Fishcake away to live in Anchorage. Tom and Fishcake meet Hester, who kills Skhin's men in the pandemonium.

Zero discovers the Stalker Fang has commanded General Naga, the Green Storm's second-in-command, to destroy Brighton. On board the Requiem Vortex, Fang's personal ship, Shrike finds out that Fang covets the Tin Book, after reading about Anchorage when she wanted to know more about Tom, whom she met at Rogue's Roost in Predator's Gold. Wren discovers that Cynthia is a Green Storm agent, that she killed Plovery, installed the Stalker-bird in the safe and set Cloud 9 adrift; she explains that the Tin Book will help the Green Storm win the war against the Traktionstadtsgesellschaft. Cynthia takes the Tin Book and holds them at gunpoint, but the two are saved by Pennyroyal who knocks Cynthia out. Making their way to the Peewit, they discover Skhin attempting to escape Brighton inside it. Skhin shoots Pennyroyal, seemingly takes the Tin Book and makes off on the Peewit, but the airship is destroyed by Stalker-birds.

Wren and Theo had tricked Skhin into taking a decoy, but are captured by Naga and brought before Fang. Fang takes the Book and memorizes the codes. Zero interrogates the pair, who explain to her what the Book contains. Knowing that Fang will kill thousands with it, Zero commands Shrike to kill Fang; he realises that he is the weapon she spoke of. Shrike manages to seemingly destroy Fang, scattering her battered pieces across the coastline of Africa. Suddenly remembering Hester, Shrike escapes from Naga. As Cloud 9 begins to burn and descend, the Tin Book's pages begin to blacken.

Tom and Hester recover the Jenny Haniver, but Hester leaves Fishcake behind as revenge for taking Wren, despite Tom's pleas to go back for him. Wren and Theo discover Pennyroyal survived his wounds and take him with them as they try to escape. Zero also attempts to escape but is blocked by Naga. Secretly disgusted by Fang's actions in the war and wasting men, Naga commends Zero for orchestrating the Stalker's demise and takes control of the Green Storm. Naga takes Zero and the passengers from Cloud 9 on board the Requiem Vortex and leave.

Pennyroyal tells Wren that Hester sold Anchorage to Arkangel, one of the few elements of his book that was true, but she doesn't believe him. Tom and Hester finds the three, but Hester attempts to kill Pennyroyal to make sure that her crime to Anchorage isn't discovered, but Wren tells Tom about what she did to stop her. Hester flees into the burning wreckage of Cloud 9 in despair, where Shrike finds her. Tom, Wren, Theo and Pennyroyal escape in the Jenny Haniver, as Cloud 9 finally collapses onto the African shore. As scavenger towns arrive, Shrike takes Hester's unconscious body into the nearby Sahara Desert.

Fishcake, escaping from the Lost Boys, swims to the African coast. Wandering alone on the dunes, he encounters the remains of the Stalker Fang, who asks him to rebuild her, which he agrees to.

A Darkling Plain

Six months after the events of Infernal Devices, General Naga, the now-leader of the Green Storm after the supposed demise of the Stalker Fang, has formed a truce with the Traktionstadtsgesellschaft, blossoming a new era of trade and peace.

Theo Ngoni, returning to his home of Zagwa and reuniting with his family, foils an assassination attempt on Oenone Zero, who is married to General Naga and has taken the title of Lady Naga. Zero was in Zagwa to facilitate peace terms with Zagwa and the Green Storm; and suspects that the attempt was made by Green Storm soldiers still loyal to the Stalker Fang. Due to the possibility of another attempt, Zero has an incognito merchant airship prepared that will take her an alternate route to Naga. As Theo saved her life, Zero wants him to accompany her; Theo agrees, hopeful that he might meet Wren. En route, Zero's servant Rohini is revealed to be Cynthia Twite, a Green Storm spy who survived the events of Infernal Devices, and attempts to kill her, but Theo intervenes. Cynthia escapes and downs the airship. The pair survive the crash, but Zero is captured by air-trader Napster Varley who plans to sell her to the Traktionstadtsgesellschaft; whilst Theo is saved from slavers by Hester Shaw and the Stalker Shrike, who is unable to kill due to Zero's tampering. After Theo informs them of Zero's capture, Hester and Shrike decide to find her, as Zero will be able to reverse Shrike's "barrier" she implemented.

Cynthia reaches Naga's base in Tienjing and lies to him that Zero was killed by the Zagwans, though Naga refuses to take action against Tractionists. Cynthia manages to weasel her way to serve in Naga's household.

In the Traction City of Peripatetiapolis, Tom Natsworthy discovers that the bullet that Nimrod Pennyroyal shot him with in Predator's Gold has damaged his heart and he has not long to live, though he doesn't tell his daughter Wren. Tom soon discovers a woman that resembles Clytie Potts, a London Apprentice Historian that he knew. When questioned, she tells him that her name is Cruwys Morchard and that she is transporting Old-Tech devices. Unconvinced, Tom and Wren decide to pursue her, travelling on the Jenny Haniver to Murnau, a Traktionstadtsgesellschaft city, where they meet Wolf von Kobold, the son of the Mayor of Murnau and commander of the traction city Harrowbarrow. Wolf believes that the survivors of MEDUSA may be still inside London, and the three agree to make an expedition to London.

Tom and Wren meet Wolf on Harrowbarrow, a burrowing Traction City, which takes them closer to London. With Wolf accompanying them, they fly the Jenny Haniver over the Green Storm border, and finally reaching the debris field of London. There they discover that the survivors of MEDUSA have rebuilt a society in London, led by Tom's old boss and now Mayor Chudleigh Pomeroy. Garamond, the paranoid head of security, convinces Pomeroy to keep them there as he suspects that they may inform others of London's survival. Tom, Wren and Wolf eventually discover a new traction town being rebuilt near the ruins, a project that was in-progress long before Magnus Crome decided to use MEDUSA. Noticing that "New London" has no wheels, the leading Engineer Dr. Childermass explains that it uses Magnetic Levitation to float above the ground, making it less harmful to the environment. Wolf slips away from the conversation and escapes back to Harrowbarrow, intent on devouring New London and to use the technology to make his city better.

Meanwhile, the former Lost Boy Fishcake has partially rebuilt the Stalker Fang in Cairo. The Stalker Fang often malfunctions, alternating in personality between the kind and supportive Anna-side and the cold and merciless Stalker-side. Fishcake informs Fang that Cairo is stopping to trade with Lost Boy-ruled Brighton where they steal a limpet and make their way to the state of Shan Guo, where the Stalker will do something "important".

Walking the rest of the way by foot, Fishcake and Fang stops at a hermitage, that is inhabited by Sathya, an exiled commander of the Green Storm and an old friend to Anna. The Anna-side of the Stalker doesn't wish to harm Sathya, and wants former London Engineer Dr. Popjoy, who resurrected her in Predator's Gold to eliminate the Stalker-side. Despite protestations, Fishcake accompanies her to Batmunkh Gompa. However, before meeting Popjoy, the Stalker-side returns and demands that he remove the Anna-side. Popjoy explains to her that the brain he fitted her with in Rogue's Roost was from a much older model he found in the Arctic and that it was from a "Remembering Machine" that helped to keep a nomad culture alive. When Popjoy discovers that the Stalker Fang will reactivate ODIN (standing for Orbital Defence Initiative), an orbital weapon with firepower similar to MEDUSA, he protests; but the Stalker kills him. The Stalker Fang takes Fishcake with her to Erdene Tezh, her old home.

Napster Varely arrives in Airhaven, which is floating above the Traktionstadtgesellschaft, and unsuccessfully attempts to sell Zero to Wolf's father Kriegsmarschall von Kobold. Hester, Theo and Shrike arrive at the floating city and attempt to buy her from Varley, who asks for an extortionate price which they cannot pay. Hester and Theo discover Pennyroyal hiding in Airhaven in disgrace and debt after a newspaper exposed him as a fraud. Hester takes what remains of his money and heads to Varley's ship to buy Zero, with Theo accidentally mentioning to Pennyroyal about Zero being alive. With this knowledge and seeking to reclaim fame, Pennyroyal rounds up men from Manchester and marches to Varley's ship. Discovering a photograph of Zero that Varley placed on him, von Kobold attempts to rescue her to make further peace with Naga.

Hester's attempt to cheat Varley is discovered and he attacks her, but his abused wife kills him. As Hester and Zero make their way back, von Kobold finds them and helps them. Pennyroyal arrives with the Manchester men and a fight ensues where von Kobold is shot, but survives via his Old-Tech armour. Shrike manages to scare them away and gets Hester and Zero to their airship the Shadow Aspect and escape. Pennyroyal gets into an altercation with a journalist and falls from Airhaven and is assumed dead, but lands in the rigging of the Shadow Aspect. Stalker-birds arrive but escort the airship to a Green Storm air base where they are hailed as heroes. The base is soon attacked by the Traktionstadtsgesellschaft and Harrowbarrow. All escape in an airship heading east except Theo who stays behind to retrieve a letter that Wren sent him, but is seemingly killed by a bomb shell.

Wolf returns to Harrowbarrow and meets with von Kobold and the Mayor of Manchester Adlai Browne. With support from other Traktionstadtsgesellschaft cities, Browne intends to destroy the Green Storm, despite von Kobold wanting peace. In Tienjing, Naga is informed of the Green Storm air base being attacked but does nothing, disheartened by Zero's supposed death. Cynthia has been poisoning his green tea to make him helpless further and fanatically believes that the Stalker Fang will return.

Fishcake and the Stalker Fang, whose personalities seem to be merged, steal Popjoy's air yacht and reach Erdene Tezh and her old home. Inside, she starts to create a device which will relay orders to ODIN.

Theo survives the attack on the airfield and treks east across the plains toward London, where Wren's letter told him she would be; whilst the surviving Green Storm soldiers are transported off to Forward Command, an old traction city where Hester, Shrike and Zero were taken. Theo eventually reaches New London and is reunited with Wren, as well as warning the residents that the war between the Green Storm and the Traktionstadtsgesellschaft has restarted.

ODIN is fired upon Manchester and other cities by the Stalker Fang, killing Browne. Orla Twombley, a pilot formerly from Brighton, observes the destruction and reports to von Kobold in Murnau, telling him and the remaining cities to retreat from a Green Storm weapon. Naga receives communication that Zero is alive, and, realising that Twite has deceived him confronts her. Twite attempts to kill him, but ODIN fires on Tienjing. Naga survives but Twite is killed instantly in the blast.

The residents of New London see the firepower of ODIN from afar, and fearing that it is a Green Storm weapon, make plans to head north when the city is finished. Tom, fearing for Wren, takes the Jenny Haniver to Tienjing, hoping to convince Naga to not use his supposed weapon. Tom leaves a letter to Wren saying his goodbyes and entrusting Theo to take care for her, admitting that he is dying. Wolf hears of Manchester's destruction and is determined to continue on to London, claiming to his underlings that Harrowbarrow's creeping nature will help them survive.

Hester, Shrike, Zero and Pennyroyal make their way to Batmunkh Gompa to reunite with Naga, who has been evacuated to there. They are told of the destruction of traction cities and Tienjing alike, which Shrike deduces is the work of the Stalker Fang. Zero intends to talk to Popjoy as he built the Stalker Fang and may know how to disable her for good.

Wren discovers Tom's letter and attempts to follow him with Theo, but they are stopped by Garamond, who believes they are Green Storm agents and are escaping to betray New London. It is revealed that Pomeroy had died in his sleep when Tom left New London and Garamond has taken his place. Garamond arrests the pair, but Childermass frees them and tells them to escape to a Green Storm settlement. It is revealed that Childermass is the mother of Bevis Pod.

Tom, flying the Jenny Haniver, is intercepted on his way to Tienjing and brought to Batmunkh Gompa, where he is interrogated by Naga. Tom pleads for Naga to not use the weapon on New London, but Naga mistakes him for a Traktionstadtsgesellschaft spy and disbelieves him. Hester and the others arrive in Batmunkh Gompa, where Zero discovers Popjoy is dead. When Zero meets with Naga, he accuses her of being a spy, believing that London is the master of the new weapon and that Popjoy faked his death to join them. Naga has Zero beaten and detained, then orders for their forces to attack London. Pennyroyal informs Hester and Shrike of Zero's predicament, and Hester is shakily reunited with Tom, who tells her that Theo is alive and with Wren in London. With Shrike, the pair escape on the Jenny Haniver. The Stalker Fang targets Zhan Shan, a volcano, with ODIN, triggering an eruption that will last for weeks and destroy many provinces. Tom and Hester deduce that the Stalker Fang has gone to Erdene Tezh and fly the Jenny Haniver there.

Wren and Theo hear Harrowbarrow approaching to devour New London. Wren boards it whilst Theo warns the Londoners of the approaching city. Wren confronts Wolf, and tricks him into diverting Harrowbarrow into an area that is full of energy left from MEDUSA. The Green Storm arrives and attacks, though Wolf continues ahead, having dealt with the Green Storm before, but Harrowbarrow is damaged by MEDUSA's left-over energy. Theo boards it and finds Wren, but Harrowbarrow starts moving again. Naga, informed of Harrowbarrow's approach, realises his error and defends New London, which finally begins to move, with Harrowbarrow in pursuit. Wolf confronts Wren and Theo on Harrowbarrow's back, but Wren accidentally kills Wolf when Naga's airship arrives and rescues them. Naga drops Wren and Theo on New London and pilots his airship straight into Harrowbarrow in a kamikaze attack, destroying the city and allowing New London to escape.

On board the Jenny Haniver, Shrike finds Pennyroyal hiding, and the three tie him up. Stalker-birds attack the airship, severely damaging it. Shrike manages to save the three from being killed, but falls out of the ship and into the mountains. The airship downs near Fang's old home, where Hester and Tom leave Pennyroyal. Fishcake, having heard the airship, confronts them and tries to kill Hester, but is stopped by the Stalker Fang. Fishcake demands she kills them, but the Stalker Fang hits him and Fishcake runs away. Tom's heart begins to strain and he collapses. The Stalker Fang, deciding not to kill them as they will all die soon enough, takes Tom into the house as Hester follows.

The Stalker Fang explains to Tom and Hester that she destroyed various traction cities and Green Storm bases to make the two sides fight each other, giving her time to send a command to ODIN. This command targets various volcanoes around the Earth, which will erupt and kill humanity in the resulting volcanic winter, but will "make the world green again". Fishcake finds Pennyroyal, and they plan to escape in Popjoy's sky-yacht, but need the keys around the Stalker Fang's neck. Pennyroyal finds an anti-Stalker weapon that Hester dropped and makes his way toward the house. Tom attempts to convince the Anna-side of the Stalker to destroy ODIN, and the Stalker flashes between the converging personalities. Pennyroyal suddenly enters and kills the Stalker Fang, which falls onto the ODIN transmitter and destroys it. Tom's heart strains and he collapses again, whilst Pennyroyal takes the key to the sky-yacht and attempt to bring it to them to save Tom. As Hester takes Tom outside, they see a twinkling star in the sky, and Hester realises that the Stalker Fang had ordered ODIN to destroy itself. Pennyroyal attempts to fly the sky-yacht to Tom and Hester, but is threatened by Fishcake to leave them behind as revenge for leaving him on Brighton. Hester watches the sky-yacht fly away, and she comforts Tom as he dies. Hester commits suicide shortly afterwards.

Zero is informed of Naga's demise, and is appointed leader of the Green Storm, which she reforms as the Anti-Traction League. She makes a treaty with von Kobold to cease fighting forever, with many traction cities subsequently becoming static. Popjoy's sky-yacht fails outside Batmunkh Gompa, and Fishcake abandons Pennyroyal, who travels back to Murnau and spends time in debtors' prison before writing a truthful account of the events he survived, titling it Ignorant Armies. However, it is never published due to his fraudulent activities, and Pennyroyal lives out the rest of his life in Peripatetiapolis with an old girlfriend. Fishcake makes his way to Sathya's hermitage, where he lives with her into adulthood and has children of his own. He comes to regret leaving Hester and Tom in Erdene Tezh, though he believes that they were resourceful enough to find a way to escape. Wren and Theo leave New London in the north a year later, and go to Zagwa to see Theo's family. When Airhaven arrives, Wren and Theo buy a new airship with Wolf's expedition money, calling it the Jenny Haniver II and become air-traders. New London thrives as it escapes predator cities and trades with anti-gravity furniture.

Miles away, Shrike revives himself and arrives at Erdene Tezh too late, finding the remains of the Stalker Fang. Although her Stalker brain is dead, Shrike downloads memories from the older part of her brain. He then finds Tom and Hester's bodies, and considers taking Hester to be Resurrected, but decides against it when he sees that they held hands when they died. As he takes their bodies, Shrike recalls his own long-lost memories of his own two children (Ruan and Fern from Fever Crumb) before he was turned into a Stalker. Laying the bodies down in an outcrop nearby, Shrike shuts down and watches their bodies decompose over the years. As the years flash by him, an oak tree grows from Hester's body, and he eventually slows this time lapse when he notices human figures nearby. Finally out of his fugue state, Shrike discovers that a forest has grown round him, and meets a girl and a boy. The pair take him down into a village, where Shrike finds that he was considered an old shrine statue, and the people hung flowers around his neck for luck.

The Stalker discovers that the village has used Childermass’ anti-gravity machines, and that he has woken hundreds, if not thousands of years into the future. When he asks if there are any traction cities in the world, the village people explain that they are thought to be fairy tales nowadays and find the idea ridiculous. When the people ask what he was for, Shrike responds that he is a "Remembering Machine", and is asked to tell his story.

Characters

A few of the people in the books are named after places in Devon, where Reeve lives, including Chudleigh, Tamerton Foliot and the River Plym. In the quartet, Miss Plym and Chudleigh Pomeroy are both in the Guild of Historians, and Tamarton Foliot is an "Alternative" historian. Both Shrike and Smew are named after birds, and Pennyroyal is named after a flower. Many of the characters are named after ancient (in the context of the books) brands: Windolene Pye, Daz Gravy, Nutella Eisberg, Napster Varley, and Nabisco Shkin for example. Friends of Philip Reeve are also occasionally mentioned in the books as characters; for instance 'Poskitt' is included as a god, clearly referring to Kjartan Poskitt, a friend and the author of books that Reeve has illustrated in the past.

 Hester Shaw, a wild 15-year-old girl. She has copper hair and grey eyes.
 Tom Natsworthy, a 15-year-old boy who is an apprentice Historian at the beginning of the series. Tom eventually has many diverse adventures across the world. Tom greatly admires the head of historians, Valentine. Tom possesses the trait of having a very strong sense of curiosity.
 Wren Natsworthy, Tom and Hester's daughter who is kidnapped from their home and as a result, finds herself experiencing the same sort of adventures as her parents had. 
 Theo Ngoni, an African aviator who runs away from his home to join the Green Storm, and later becomes very close to Wren. A former Green Storm tumbler pilot, now a slave aboard Brighton, he later escapes with Wren at the end of the book. They are married at the end of the quartet.
 Nimrod Beauregard Pennyroyal, a supposed historian and author who is actually a fraud. He is selfish, narcissistic and cowardly, but has a knack for surviving dangerous experiences, and often shares adventures with the Natsworthy family. After surviving the events of A Darkling Plain, Pennyroyal writes a truthful book about what happened, but is ironically rebuffed due to his previous fraudulent actions being revealed. 
 Anna Fang, an Asian pilot and former owner of the Jenny Haniver, she is also a leading agent of the Anti-Traction League. She is killed at the end of Mortal Engines but is Resurrected as the Stalker Fang, who overthrows the rulers of the League and installs herself as a military dictator.
 Thaddeus Valentine, a dashing and handsome Historian often idolised by younger Historians – though his less public image involves murder and thievery as an agent of London. He is killed in the destruction of London by MEDUSA. He is, in fact, Hester's biological father. 
 Shrike (also known in the American release of the series as Grike), an ancient Stalker who raised Hester after her parents were killed.
 Katherine Valentine, Thaddeus Valentine's daughter. After uncovering her father's dark secret, she attempts to stop him with help from Bevis Pod and the Guild of Historians. She is accidentally killed by Thaddeus shortly before the destruction of MEDUSA and London.

Traction Cities
Some Traction Cities bear present-day names, but some, such as Airhaven and Motoropolis, are invented. All Traction Cities consist of several 'tiers' fixed to a huge hull containing engine rooms, storage hangars, and a large 'gut' where captured towns are dismantled. At the sides are enormous tracks or wheels; and huge hydraulic 'jaws' at the bows to capture smaller towns. Named Traction cities in the series include:

Airship names
Airships in the quartet carry unusual or quirky names reminiscent of the style of the names of ships in Iain M. Banks' Culture series.

 Jenny Haniver – named for the carcass of a dried-out skate or ray resembling a demon (this ship is later renamed the Arctic Roll)
 13th Floor Elevator – from the band of similar name
 Invisible Worm – a reference to William Blake's poem, The Sick Rose (also known as the Screw Worm)
 Aerymouse – archaic name for a bat
 Idiot Wind – a Bob Dylan song on the album Blood on the Tracks
 My Shirona – from the hit single by The Knack
 Mokele Mbembe – a cryptozoological creature of the Congo Basin
 Garden Aeroplane Trap – a surrealist painting by Max Ernst
  Zainab – several women in Islamic history
 Group Captain Mandrake – One of the main characters in the film Dr. Strangelove
 Clear Air Turbulence – also the name of a 1976 album by Ian Gillan and a ship in Consider Phlebas
 Temporary Blip
 Plum Blossom Spring
 Die Leiden des Jungen Werther
 Shadow Aspect
 Protecting Veil
 Hungry ghost
 Combat Wombat

MEDUSA and ODIN
MEDUSA is an Ancient superweapon, a remnant of the Sixty Minute War. It is a major feature of the first book in the series, as Historians in London have found the plans for the weapon, which is then reconstructed in London's Saint Paul's Cathedral and used against that city's enemies. It's alluded to being an energy beam that radiates from the weapon's firing head. Some people didn't like this as they said it was a waste, as they cannot salvage anything after MEDUSA obliterates a target.

ODIN is the Orbital Defence Initiative, an orbital satellite weapon; a very powerful remnant of the Sixty Minute War and a major feature of the third and fourth books in the series: Infernal Devices and A Darkling Plain. It was built as part of the arms race between the American Empire and Greater China. It and MEDUSA are the only superweapons known to have survived until the events of the series, although there are several references to other orbital superweapons (Diamond Bat, Jinju 14, and the Nine Sisters, for example). ODIN is more powerful than MEDUSA and is able to hit any target on the surface of the earth. ODIN is an American satellite, as the code for controlling the satellite comes off an American submarine, and it briefly searches for the American cities it was placed in orbit to defend after it is reawakened by the Stalker Fang. The other orbital weapons are hinted to have broken up over time and fallen from the sky.

ODIN is an energy weapon that converts a small nuclear bomb into a directed incinerating beam (a weapon concept similar to the Strategic Defense Initiative's Project Excalibur). This has the power to exterminate cities (both traction and static) and provoke volcanic eruptions. Its beam can be seen for very long distances and seems to interfere with the mechanical minds of Stalkers. Only Shrike's Old-Tech Stalker brain has the mettle to withstand this, although he goes into a fit-like state and it is hinted he is saved by Dr Oenone Zero. Anna Fang is unaffected. Other Stalkers lose all power.

The Tin Book, copied from a US Military document recovered by the refugees of the original Anchorage from a submarine, is a codebook for controlling ODIN. It is stolen by the Lost Boys and, later, Brighton. It then falls into the hands of the Stalker Fang, who memorises its contents and then leaves it to be destroyed on Cloud 9. It is then destroyed in a fire; when Fang is rebuilt by Fishcake, her Stalker alter-ego travels towards Batmunkh Gompa to steal parts for a transmitter with the power to reach ODIN, and then travels on Anna Fang's residence, where there is enough Old-Tech to finish the transmitter. The journey is delayed by Anna Fang's confused and caring personality. At Batmunkh Gompa the Stalker takes control until the final scene.

When ODIN is fired, confusion ensues as both the Green Storm and Traction Cities are targeted. Both sides try to find the transmitter, leading to the Storm's assault of London, but it is Tom, Hester, Shrike, and Pennyroyal who find Fang. As Fang prepares to target all the volcanoes on the earth and so destroy humanity, a final confrontation from Tom brings Anna to the fore once more and she orders ODIN to turn its beam weapon upon itself, destroying it completely.

As well as its immensely powerful weaponry, ODIN appears to show signs of intelligence. When it is awakened, it queries its new position and briefly searches for its old masters, and notes the vast difference in geography since its last awakening. It can also zoom in to an individual's face on the Earth and, although the picture is grainy, it is still identifiable. It can change its orbit when directed to target all over the globe. This, as well as the Stalker minds found among Old-Tech (and Shrike) seems to prove that robots had, by the time of the Sixty Minute War, achieved sentience.

Influences
Reeve has stated that major influences on the Mortal Engines Quartet include Star Wars and The Lord of the Rings.

Awards and recognition
The first volume, Mortal Engines, won the 2002 Smarties Prize. A Darkling Plain won the 2006 Guardian prize.

Related works

Fever Crumb Series

The Fever Crumb Series is a second series of novels set centuries or millennia before the events depicted in the Quartet. The main character is Fever Crumb, a London Engineer who is partially descended from the Scriven, a mutant race of humans. The series also introduced the character Shrike, revealing his origins before he became a Stalker.

The Fever Crumb series also visits many of the locations not depicted in the Mortal Engines Quartet.

The Traction Codex
The Traction Codex is a fictional reference book set in the world of Mortal Engines, written by Philip Reeve and Jeremy Levett. The Codex has only been published in a digital format, as it was originally available only for the digital version of the Mortal Engines Quartet. The book was later made available as a stand-alone e-book.

Reeve has expressed his wishes to publish it in the form of a paper book, with additional illustrations and information, which would finally be realised with the release of The Illustrated World of Mortal Engines in November 2018.

Traction City
Traction City is a short story written for World Book Day 2011. It details the actions of a policeman in the under tiers of London on the hunt for a stalker.  A young Anna Fang explores her early life.

This story would later be rewritten as the short story Traction City Blues in the Night Flights compilation of stories released in 2018.

In the Bleak Midwinter
In the Bleak Midwinter is a short story written online by Philip Reeve and Sarah McIntyre, following the young Hester Shaw and Shrike aboard the town of Twyne.

Night Flights
Night Flights is a short story collection featuring three short stories about the adventures of Anna Fang. It consists of three short stories: Frozen Heart, Traction City Blues, and Teeth of the Sea.

The Illustrated World of Mortal Engines
The Illustrated World of Mortal Engines is a guide to the world of the Traction Era, expanding on the Traction Codex. Written by Philip Reeve and Jeremy Levett and designed by Jamie Gregory, it features illustrations from a variety of artists. Ian McQue and David Wyatt have both also designed covers for the Mortal Engines series. The IWOME also features illustrations by Amir Zand, Rob Turpin, Aedel Fahkrie and Philip Varbanov, and maps designed by Lowtuff and illustrated by Maxime Plasse.

Adaptations

Film

In 2009, Peter Jackson, director of the Lord of the Rings trilogy, expressed interest in directing the film adaptations. He ended up producing and co-writing the film adaptation of the first book in the Quartet. The film is directed by Christian Rivers. The movie is based on the novel Mortal Engines, adapted to screen by Fran Walsh, Philippa Boyens and Peter Jackson, though its movie universe is different from that of the books. It stars Hugo Weaving, Hera Hilmar, Robert Sheehan, Jihae, Ronan Raftery, Leila George, Patrick Malahide, and Stephen Lang. The film was released in theaters on 6 December 2018, received generally negative reviews and was a commercial failure.

Video games
In an interview with Polygon on 30 October 2018, producer Peter Jackson explained an absence of a game based around the 2018 Mortal Engines movie, saying if that film performs well enough to make a sequel, there will definitely be a videogame to follow.

Legacy 
Critics have suggested that the 2019 Amazon Prime Video series Carnival Row is influenced by the Mortal Engines series of novels, amongst other influences.

References

Further reading

External links
 
 
 
 Orbital Trash – a short story written by Reeve and published in small press magazine RQC in 1996 shows several concepts and ideas which later resurfaced in the Quartet
 Urbivore – a short story written by Reeve in the 1990s, which – along with the above – became the basis for the Quartet
 Artwork by Julia Zhuravleva

Mortal Engines
Book series introduced in 2001
Novel series
Science fiction book series
Post-apocalyptic novels
Steampunk novels
Eco-terrorism in fiction
Philip Reeve
Fictional airships
 
Aviation novels